Ragnar Jansson (1 October 1908 – 9 September 1977) was a Finnish sailor who competed in the 1948 Summer Olympics and in the 1952 Summer Olympics.

References

1908 births
1977 deaths
Finnish male sailors (sport)
Olympic sailors of Finland
Sailors at the 1948 Summer Olympics – 6 Metre
Sailors at the 1952 Summer Olympics – 6 Metre
Olympic bronze medalists for Finland
Olympic medalists in sailing
Medalists at the 1952 Summer Olympics